Enzo Masiello (born 5 March 1969) is an Italian Paralympic cross-country skier and biathlete who also formerly competed as a long distance runner at the Summer Paralympics. He has competed at the Paralympics in 6 occasions representing Italy both at the Summer Paralympics (1992, 1996 and 2000) and at the Winter Paralympics (2006, 2010 and 2014). Enzo is also the first Italian male athlete to win a medal both at the Summer Paralympics and in the Winter Paralympics. He was a recipient of the Order of Merit of the Italian Republic, which is one of the highest honours to be given in the nation.

Biography 
Enzo Masiello confronted with paraplegia following a traffic accident at the age of 18 which persuaded him to take the sport of wheelchair athletics.

Career 
After the tragic accident he faced during his teenage, he took the sport of Paralympic athletics and started to compete in 1990 before switching to skiing in 2004 following his success at the Para athletics. He decided to compete in skiing as a new challenge and got the opportunity to represent Italy at the 2006 Winter Paralympics after ending his Summer Paralympics career in 2000.

Summer Paralympics 
He made his first Paralympic appearance for Italy at the 1992 Summer Paralympics and was successful in his maiden Summer Paralympic event after claiming a bronze medal in the men's 5000m category, which is also his only medal at the Paralympic athletics. He also went onto compete at the 1996 Summer Paralympics and in the 2000 Summer Paralympics but went medalless in both of the multi-sport events.

Winter Paralympics 
After representing Italy at the Summer Paralympics in 3 previous editions, he switched to participate at the Winter Paralympics and qualified to compete with the 2006 Winter Paralympics, where he couldn't claim any medal in his maiden Winter Paralympics event. Enzo Masiello managed to clinch his first Winter Paralympic medals (a silver and a bronze medal) at the 2010 Winter Paralympics. He was the flagbearer for Italy at the closing ceremony during the 2010 Winter Paralympics.

References

External links 
 

1969 births
Living people
Italian wheelchair racers
Italian male cross-country skiers
Italian male biathletes
Athletes (track and field) at the 1992 Summer Paralympics
Athletes (track and field) at the 1996 Summer Paralympics
Athletes (track and field) at the 2000 Summer Paralympics
Cross-country skiers at the 2006 Winter Paralympics
Cross-country skiers at the 2010 Winter Paralympics
Cross-country skiers at the 2014 Winter Paralympics
Biathletes at the 2010 Winter Paralympics
Biathletes at the 2014 Winter Paralympics
Paralympic athletes of Italy
Paralympic cross-country skiers of Italy
Paralympic biathletes of Italy
Paralympic silver medalists for Italy
Paralympic bronze medalists for Italy
Medalists at the 1992 Summer Paralympics
Medalists at the 2010 Winter Paralympics
People from Matera
Recipients of the Order of Merit of the Italian Republic
Paralympic medalists in athletics (track and field)
Paralympic medalists in cross-country skiing
Sportspeople from the Province of Matera